Howard Park may refer to:
 Howard Park, Queens, a neighborhood in Howard Beach, Queens, New York City
 Howard Park, Baltimore, part of Forest Park
 Howard Park, Kilmarnock, East Ayrshire, Scotland
 Howard Park P.S. 218, an elementary school in Baltimore, Maryland, United States 
 Howard Park Wines, a winery in Western Australia
 Howard Park and Gardens, a recreation area in Letchworth, England

See also
 Howard Parkes (1877–1920), English cricketer
 Dr. Howard A. Kelly Park, Orange County, Florida
 Fred H. Howard Park, a pocket beach near Tarpon Springs, Pinellas County, Florida